Wilbur Lucius Cross III (August 17, 1918 – March 4, 2019) was an American author with over 50 books to his credit. He spent 10 years as an editor at Life. He was the grandson of Wilbur Lucius Cross.

Early life and education
Cross wrote mini books for his friends at an early age. He graduated from Kent School in 1937 and Yale University.

Upon graduation from Yale, he served in the United States Army and became a captain. He served in the Pacific theater during World War II for 39 months with communications, radar and photo units.

Career
After serving in the army, he worked for an ad agency where he was a copy writer. He became a senior editor for Continental Oil Company, where he wrote CONOCO, The First One Hundred Years.

As a free-lance writer in the 1950s and 1960s, he interviewed General Umberto Nobile and survivors of airship Italia, which crashed in the artic pole in 1928, for an article in True magazine. This became the basis for the book, Disaster at the Pole.

He died in March 2019 at the age of 100.

Books
Challengers of the Deep
Disaster at the Pole
Encyclopedia of American Submarines (2003)
Gullah Culture in America (2012)
Zeppelins of World War I (2003)

References

1918 births
2019 deaths
American centenarians
American magazine editors
American male non-fiction writers
Kent School alumni
United States Army officers
Yale University alumni
Men centenarians
United States Army personnel of World War II